The Sehol X7 or previously the Sol X7 or Jiayue X7 is a mid-size crossover SUV that was produced by JAC Motors under the Sehol brand and Jiayue brand respectively. Originally it was launched as the Jiayue X7 in 2020, the crossover is essentially an extensive facelift of the Refine S7. By October 2020, the crossover was rebadged as the Sol X7. The Sol X7 and Jiayue X7 were sold alongside each other for a brief period before the Jiayue brand was discontinued. As of 2021, the Sol vehicles were badged as Sehol.

It is also marketed in Mexico as the JAC Sei 7 Pro and in Iran as the KMC K7.

Overview

The Sol X7 or Jiayue X7 is a mid-size crossover that was positioned above the compact JAC Jiayue X4 crossover in the Jiayue product series. Despite the model essentially being an extensive facelift of its predecessor, the Refine S7, the Jiayue X7 is the first crossover product of the JAC passenger car layout in the 3.0 era according to officials.

Specifications
The top speed of the Jiayue X7 is 160 km/hr. The Jiayue X7 price ranges from 89,800 to 119,800 yuan (~US$12,696 – US$16,938) for the Chinese market.

The Jiayue X7 is only available in five-seat versions at launch, and is equipped with the updated J-Link intelligent car networking system, with the center floating LCD screen and the full LCD instrument panel being 12.3 inches. The screen also integrates iflytek car voice 3.5 system and APP remote control, built-in car karaoke, Gaode maps, and 360-degree panoramic images and linked to a panoramic driving recorder. The JAC Jiayue X7 comes standard with 14 electronic stability systems and TESS flat tire emergency safety systems. Higher trim models of the Jiayue X7 are also equipped with LDWS lane departure warning systems and AEB automatic emergency brakes.

Markets

Mexico 
The Sehol X7 is marketed under the name of JAC Sei 7 Pro in the Mexican market. It was introduced on 24 August 2021 with pre-sales starting on 26 August. Equipped with a four-cylinder 1.5 litre turbo engine, it is offered in the Quantum and Limited trim levels, and available in four colours; white, blue, red, black, and dual-tone, the latter only for the Quantum trim. It arrived in all Mexican JAC showrooms on 30 August 2021.

References

External links
Official website

Jiayue X7
Mid-size sport utility vehicles
Crossover sport utility vehicles
Front-wheel-drive vehicles
Cars introduced in 2020
Cars of China